The Alexians officially named as the Congregation of Alexian Brothers abbreviated C.F.A., is a Catholic lay religious congregation of Pontifical Right for men specifically devoted to caring for the sick which has its origin in Europe at the time of the Black Death. They follow the Augustinian rule.

History
The Alexians trace their origin to the early 12th-century Beghards, male counterparts of the Beguines, laywomen who followed a devout style of life in a limited degree of common life. The men did not get much attention until they made a great contribution to history in the city of Mechelen, in the Duchy of Brabant (in central Flanders, now Belgium), some time in the 14th century, during the terrible ravages of the Black Death. Some laymen united under the guidance of a man named Tobias to succor the plague-stricken without taking any vows or adopting monasticism. One of their most obvious activities was caring for those stricken with the bubonic plague, along with their families, and burying those who died. These laymen lived in little rooms or cells (from Latin "cella," a cell that gave rise to their early name of "Cellites").

The speculation that the name "Beghards" arose from supporting themselves by begging for food was dismissed by the Encyclopædia Britannica Eleventh Edition.

The plague victims became the outcasts of the society and were thrown outside the city walls, along with the other marginalized folk, to die. Moved by compassion, these laymen came together and vowed to take care of these victims who were abandoned by not only the state and the church, but also their families. Later on, the group attracted more men who chose to abandon their secular lives to live in community as brothers and to serve the needs of the poor. Eventually, the Catholic Church saw the utility of the brothers and invited them to be formally recognized as a religious group and subsequently gave them pontifical status. The brothers were associated with a chapel dedicated to Alexius of Rome, who had served many years in a hospital at Edessa in Syria, and they began to be called the Brothers at St. Alexius Chapel, a name that evolved into that of Alexian Brothers, their modern name.

Germany 
The Brothers rapidly spread throughout Germany, Brabant, Flanders, and other countries. They were also styled in Middle Dutch lollebroeders "mumbling brothers", or "Lollhorden", from Old , meaning "to sing softly," from their chants for the dead. This name was later adopted as a term of contempt, applied first to Franciscans and later to the heretical followers of John Wycliffe. The Alexians did not escape calumny and persecution, as demonstrated from the papal bull "Ad Audientiam Nostram" (2 December 1377) which Pope Gregory XI sent to the German bishops, especially those of Cologne, Trier and Mainz, forbidding annoyance of the "Cellites" and enjoining punishment for their persecutors. This was followed by Bulls of a similar tenor from Pope Boniface IX on 7 January 1396, Pope Eugene IV on 12 May 1431, Pope Nicholas V and Pope Pius II.

In 1469, the motherhouse at Aachen voiced the general feeling of the Brothers in asking Louis de Bourbon, Bishop of Liège, to raise that house to a convent of the Order of Saint Augustine. The request was granted, and in 1854 Father Dominicus Brock and five of the Brothers took the solemn vows of religious under the rule of St. Augustine. This step and the revised constitution of the religious institute were confirmed by Pope Pius IX on 12 September 1870.

Hospitals 
In the early 20th century the Alexian Brothers had four hospitals in the United States. The first was built in Chicago in 1866; it was destroyed by the Great Fire, on 9 October 1871, and rebuilt the following year. The second, erected at St. Louis in 1869, covered an acre with its departments for the insane, nervous diseases, and inebriates. The third was in Oshkosh, Wisconsin and built in 1880. The fourth was built in Elizabeth, New Jersey, on land given for that purpose by Right Rev. Bishop Wigger. Competent surgeons and physicians attended to the patients, and the Brothers nursed and did the housework of the hospitals. Later in the century, a fifth hospital was built in San Jose, Ca. in 1965.

Today, the Chicago hospital has become the Alexian Brothers Medical Center and Rehabilitation Hospital in Elk Grove Village, Illinois, the St. Alexius Medical Center in Hoffman Estates, Illinois, and the Alexian Brothers Behavioral Health Hospital in Hoffman Estates. These also operate satellite centers and clinics around Illinois. In Missouri, Tennessee and Wisconsin the Alexians run a group of facilities, care systems, homes and communities all for older adults. The other hospitals have been sold or closed.

Bishop (later Cardinal) Herbert Vaughan of the City of Salford, England invited the Alexians to take charge of a new home and hospital in his diocese, which led to their establishing themselves in England in June 1875. Dr Richard Lacy, Bishop of Middlesbrough, secured them for his diocese in 1884. In 1885, the Brothers established a province of their institute and a novitiate in the United Kingdom. The latter, first attached to St. Mary's Convent, Newton Heath, Manchester, was later transferred to West Twyford, near Ealing, which the Alexian Brothers had purchased in 1902. The Brothers sold Twyford Abbey in 1988, and the abbey, which is a Grade II listed building, now lies derelict.

Present situation
The Immaculate Conception Province (the American Province) sponsors Alexian Brothers Health System, which provides services in acute care, residential elderly care, retirement centers, and AIDS ministry in Illinois, Missouri, Wisconsin, Tennessee, and also outside the US in the Philippines and Hungary. On 1 January 2012 the Alexian Brothers Health System became part of St. Louis-based Ascension Health, the nation's largest Catholic and non-profit health system.

The contemporary British houses in London and Manchester, as well as the Irish ones in Dublin and Limerick, include facilities for the elderly sick and physically handicapped through a nursing home and Day Centre; an AIDS ministry; care and rehabilitation of homeless men; and support for people suffering from mental illness.

On the European continent the contemporary German branch has houses in Aachen, Krefeld, Malseneck, Münster and Twistringen. In Belgium they have centres in Boechout, Tienen, Grimbergen and Henri-Chapelle, where they provide psychiatric services.

References

External links
 The Alexian Brothers International website
 Congregation Of The Alexian Brothers - Cell Brothers in ODIS - Online Database for Intermediary Structures 
 Alexian Brother facilities in the USA
 Text of the Rule of St. Augustine ( ( 2009-10-25)

Independent Augustinian communities
Christian organizations established in the 14th century
Christian organizations established in the 15th century
Catholic orders and societies
Catholic nursing orders
Institutes of Catholic religious brothers